Greg McMahon (born January 2, 1960) is an American football coach who is the special teams coordinator for the Houston Roughnecks of the XFL. He is the former special teams coordinator at Louisiana State University (LSU).

Playing career
A native of Rantoul, Illinois, McMahon was a defensive back for Eastern Illinois, graduating in 1982.

Coaching career
McMahon began his coaching career at his alma mater, Eastern Illinois, in 1982. From 1983–1984, he coached at the University of Minnesota and at the University of North Alabama from 1985–1987. He then moved on to two one-year coaching stints at Southern Illinois in 1988 and Valdosta State in 1989. 

From 1990–1991, McMahon was the tight end, offensive tackle and special teams coach for the University of Nevada at Las Vegas. McMahon then spent 13 seasons (1992–2004) as an assistant coach at the University of Illinois as a wide receiver and tight end/special teams coach. He then spent one year as tight end/special teams coach at East Carolina in 2005.

New Orleans Saints
McMahon moved to the NFL as the assistant special teams coach for the New Orleans Saints from 2006–2007 and special teams coordinator from 2008–2016.

LSU
In 2017, McMahon became the special teams consultant at LSU. On January 12, 2018, he was named special teams coordinator at LSU. 

McMahon retired from coaching following the 2021 season.

Houston Gamblers 
On March 17, 2022, it was announced that McMahon was hired as the Special teams coordinator/Tight ends coach of the Houston Gamblers of the United States Football League.

Houston Roughnecks
On September 13, 2022, McMahon was announced as Special teams coordinator of the Houston Roughnecks of the XFL

References

External links

New Orleans Saints bio

1960 births
Living people
People from Rantoul, Illinois
Eastern Illinois Panthers football players
Eastern Illinois Panthers football coaches
East Carolina Pirates football coaches
Illinois Fighting Illini football coaches
LSU Tigers football coaches
Minnesota Golden Gophers football coaches
New Orleans Saints coaches
North Alabama Lions football coaches
Southern Illinois Salukis football coaches
UNLV Rebels football coaches
Valdosta State Blazers football coaches
Houston Gamblers (2022) coaches